The fifth and final season of The Voice Kids, a Ukrainian reality singing show competition, premiered on May 26, 2019 on 1+1. Returning coaches Aleksey Zavgorodniy and Nadya Dorofeeva of Vremya i Steklo, who share a mentor chair, are joined by new coaches Jamala and Dzidzio.

Coaches

 – Winning coach/contestant. Winners are in bold,eliminated contestants in small font.
 – Runner-up coach/contestant. Final contestant first listed.

Teams
Colour key

Blind auditions
The Blind Buditions aired from May 26, 2019. During the Blind auditions, each coach must form a team of 12 young artists.

Episode 1 (May 26)

The coaches performed "Sercem ty vidchuj lyubov" at the start of the show.

Episode 2 (June 2)

Episode 3 (June 9)

Episode 4 (June 16)

The Battle rounds
After the Blind Auditions, each coach had twelve contestants for the Battle rounds. Coaches begin narrowing down the playing field by training the contestants. Each battle concluding with the respective coach eliminating two of the three contestants; the four winners for each coach advanced to the Knockouts.

Color key

Episode 5 (June 23)

Knockouts 
Color key:

Episode 6 (June 30)

Final

Episode 7 (July 7)

Round 1 
In this phase of the competition, each of the top six finalists took the stage and performed a solo song. The television audience choose the final three artists who advanced to the next round.
Color key:

Round 2 
The final round of the competition featured the top three finalists performed a solo song. Before the start of the performances, voting lines were opened live-in-show for the television audience to vote for the final three and decide the winner. The winner of The Voice Kids was announced at the end of the show.

References 

2019 Ukrainian television seasons
The Voice of Ukraine